Monte San Primo is  a mountain of Lombardy, Italy.

SOIUSA classification 

According to the SOIUSA (International Standardized Mountain Subdivision of the Alps) the mountain can be classified in the following way:
 main part = Western Alps
 major sector = North Western Alps
 section = Lugano Prealps
 subsection = Prealpi Comasche
 supergroup = Catena Gino-Camoghè-Fiorina
 group = Gruppo del San Primo
 group = Massiccio del San Primo
 code = I/B-11.I-C.8.a

Notes

Mountains of the Alps
Mountains of Lombardy
One-thousanders of Italy
Lugano Prealps